The Road to Corinth (also released as Who's Got the Black Box?) is a 1967 French-Italian Eurospy film directed by Claude Chabrol.

Plot
During the Cold War in Greece, NATO radar and missile systems experience mysterious problems caused by small breakdowns electronic black boxes. Robert Ford is murdered as he is on the verge of elucidating the problem.

His wife, Shanny, takes over the investigation despite the opposition of the head of the secret service, Mr. Sharps. The latter orders the intelligence agent Dex, a friend of Robert and Shanny, to monitor Shanny's whereabouts. Out of love for her, Dex finally agrees to help Shanny in her mission.

Dex and Shanny unmask the culprit Khalidès by discovering the black boxes, which he has hidden in the statue replicas which he produces and sells. However, a police raid comes up empty-handed. Through his henchmen, Khalidès has Shanny kidnapped and brought on a mule to an ancient temple on top of a mountain. When he ties her to a cart and is about to throw her off the cliff, she accepts his marriage proposal. Just as he has finished untying her, he is shot by the approaching Dex and falls off the cliff himself. Dex leaves his job behind and joins Shanny on her flight home.

Cast  
Jean Seberg as Shanny
Maurice Ronet as Dex
Christian Marquand as Robert Ford
Michel Bouquet as Sharps
Saro Urzì as Khalidès
Antonio Passalia as the killer
Paolo Giusti as Josio
Max Roman
Artemis Matsas
Zannino
Stève Eckhardt
Vassili Diamantopoulos
Claude Chabrol as Alkibiades, traitor

Production
La route de Corinthe was shot in Greece during 7 weeks in May and June 1967.

Release
The film premiered on 27 October 1967 in Paris, and on April 5 1968 in Germany. It was released in the U.S. on April 17, 1970 in a cut and dubbed version retitled Who's Got the Black Box?.

Reception
TV Guide called it "a spoofy spy-lark" and said "Chabrol delights in turning cliches inside out" while "demonstrating how much fun can be had from subverting the wildly improbable plot twists and unlikely events which are typical of spy capers."

References

External links
 

1967 films
1960s spy thriller films
French spy thriller films
Italian spy thriller films
Greek thriller films
Films directed by Claude Chabrol
Films shot in Saint-Tropez
Films set in Greece
Films based on French novels
1960s Italian films
1960s French films